The 2008 NCAA Division I softball season, play of college softball in the United States organized by the National Collegiate Athletic Association (NCAA) at the Division I level, began in February 2008.  The season progressed through the regular season, many conference tournaments and championship series, and concluded with the 2008 NCAA Division I softball tournament and 2008 Women's College World Series.  The Women's College World Series, consisting of the eight remaining teams in the NCAA Tournament and held in held in Oklahoma City at ASA Hall of Fame Stadium, ended on June 2, 2008.

Conference standings

Women's College World Series
The 2008 NCAA Women's College World Series took place from May 29 to June 2, 2008 in Oklahoma City.

Season leaders
Batting
Batting average: .480 – Nichole Alvarez, Monmouth Hawks
RBIs: 79 – Charlotte Morgan, Alabama Crimson Tide
Home runs: 27 – Steph Fischer, Tennessee Tech Golden Eagles

Pitching
Wins: 47-5 – Stacey Nelson, Florida Gators
ERA: 0.63 (31 ER/344.0 IP) – Angela Tincher Virginia Tech Hokies
Strikeouts: 679 – Angela Tincher Virginia Tech Hokies

Records
NCAA Division I season saves:
15 – Mallory Aldred, Canisius Golden Griffins

NCAA Division I single game doubles:
4 – Emily Troup, North Carolina Tar Heels; February 20, 2008

Junior class wins:
47 – Stacey Nelson, Florida Gators

Team wins:
70 – Florida Gators

Awards
USA Softball Collegiate Player of the Year:
Angela Tincher Virginia Tech Hokies

Honda Sports Award Softball:
Angela Tincher Virginia Tech Hokies

All America Teams
The following players were members of the All-American Teams.

First Team

Second Team

Third Team

References

External links